This is a list of seasons completed by the Frölunda ice hockey franchise of the Swedish Hockey League (SHL). The list documents the season-by-season records of the Frölunda franchise from 1944 to present, including post-season records. The Frölunda franchise was founded in 1944 as an ice hockey section in Västra Frölunda IF. They reached the premier division of Swedish ice hockey in 1959, and were charter members of Elitserien when the league was founded in 1975. In 1984 the ice hockey section became an independent franchise known as Västra Frölunda HC, they shortened their name to Frölunda HC in 2004. Since 1995 the team has been marketing them self as the Frölunda Indians.

Frölunda have won the national championship title five times, in 1965, 2003, 2005, 2016 and 2019. They have also been runners-up for the title seven times. In their 65-year history, Frölunda have made thirty-one post-season appearances while playing in the highest division. They have an overall regular season record in Elitserien and the SHL of 636 wins, 562 losses, and 288 games that have gone to overtime, which ranks fifth in the all-time standings.

Seasons

Footnotes

References

 
 
 
 
 
 

 
Swedish football-related lists